Ita Saks (3 December 1921 – 23 March 2003) was an Estonian translator and publicist. She is mainly known by her Latvian-language translations to Estonian language.

Saks was born into a Jewish family in Valga. From 1950 until 1956, she studied Estonian philology at Tartu State University.

In 1980 she gave her signature to Letter of 40 intellectuals.

Personal life
Saks married writer Juhan Smuul in 1945. The couple divorced in 1951. Afterward, she was in a relationship with writer Aadu Hint, with whom she had a daughter, translator Mare Zaneva.

Awards
 1986 Andrejs Upīts award
 1997 Order of the Three Stars
 2001 Order of the White Star, V class.

References

1921 births
2003 deaths
Estonian translators
University of Tartu alumni
Recipients of the Order of the White Star, 5th Class
Estonian Jews
People from Valga, Estonia
Soviet translators